The 2013 AAA 400 was a NASCAR Sprint Cup Series race held on September 29, 2013, at Dover International Speedway in Dover, Delaware, United States. Contested over 400 laps on the 1–mile (1.6 km) oval, it was the 29th race of the 2013 Sprint Cup Series championship, and the third race in the Chase for the Sprint Cup. Jimmie Johnson of Hendrick Motorsports won the race, his fifth win of the season and record eighth win at Dover, while Dale Earnhardt Jr. finished second. Joey Logano, Jeff Gordon, and Kyle Busch rounded out the top five.

Report

Background
The track's turns are banked at twenty-four degrees. The front stretch, the location of the finish line, is banked at nine degrees with the backstretch. The racetrack has seats for 113,000 spectators. Brad Keselowski was the defending race winner after winning the event in the 2012 race.

Before the race, Matt Kenseth was leading the Drivers' Championship with 2,111 points, while Kyle Busch stood in second with 2,097 points. Jimmie Johnson followed in third with 2,093, 18 ahead of Carl Edwards in fourth, and 20 ahead of Greg Biffle in fifth. Kevin Harvick, with 2,072, was in sixth; one ahead of Kurt Busch, who was scored seventh. Eighth-placed Jeff Gordon was five points ahead of Ryan Newman and six ahead of Clint Bowyer in ninth and tenth. Dale Earnhardt Jr. was eleventh with 2,049, seven points ahead of Joey Logano in twelfth. Kasey Kahne completed the first thirteen positions with 2,040 points. In the Manufacturers' Championship, Toyota and Chevrolet were tied for the lead with 188 points. Ford was third with 149 points before the race.

Practice and qualifying

Three practice sessions were held before the race. The first session, held on September 27, 2013, was 90 minutes long. The second and third, held a day later on September 28, 2013, were 55 and 50 minutes long. During the first practice session, Kenseth was quickest with a time of 22.556, ahead of Martin Truex Jr. and Logano in second and third. Kurt Busch followed in the fourth position, ahead of Kyle Busch in fifth.

During qualifying, forty-three cars were entered. Earnhardt Jr. clinched his second pole position of the season, with a lap time of 22.243 seconds, setting a new track record. He was joined on the front row of the grid by Kenseth. Newman qualified third, Edwards took fourth, and Aric Almirola started fifth. Keselowski, Jamie McMurray, Johnson, Kurt Busch, and Truex Jr. completed the first ten positions on the grid.

In the Saturday morning session, Kahne was quickest, ahead of Earnhardt Jr. and Gordon in second and third. Kurt Busch and Kenseth followed in the fourth and fifth positions. Johnson, Kyle Busch, Bowyer, Juan Pablo Montoya, and Truex Jr. rounded out ten quickest drivers in the session.  In the final practice session for the race, Keselowski was quickest with a time of 23.027 seconds. Johnson followed in second, ahead of Kenseth and Newman in third and fourth. Earnhardt Jr. managed fifth in the session.

Race

Following the green flag, Earnhardt Jr. gained a large lead over the rest of the pack. His lead narrowed as he caught up to the slower cars toward the back of the pack. Kenseth took the lead from Earnhardt Jr. on lap 26. Earnhardt Jr. regained the lead on lap 31 as Kenseth struggled to get around slower cars. The first caution of the race occurred for debris in turn 3 on lap 38. During this caution, Kyle Busch took over the race lead after the leaders made pit stops. Kyle Busch continued to lead the race following the restart, gaining a large lead over the rest of the field. Kyle Busch's lead eventually shrunk and on lap 71, Newman passed him for the lead. Earnhardt Jr. took back the race lead on lap 76. During a round of green-flag pit stops, Earnhardt Jr. missed the commitment line attempting to make his stop and was forced to do another lap before pitting. This cost him the race lead, which was taken over by Johnson on lap 120. Johnson continued to lead the race after the round of pit stops. Kurt Busch was forced to make an unscheduled pit stop because of a loose rear wheel. The second caution of the race came out on lap 166 due to debris in turn 1. The leaders came to pit road under this caution and Kenseth won the battle off pit road. Kenseth maintained the race lead following this caution. Kenseth led for multiple laps until he was held up by slower traffic. Johnson regained the lead from Kenseth on lap 198.

Johnson held the lead heading into the second half of the race. Keselowski had to come to pit road after fluid was coming from his car. On lap 229, the third caution was brought out from the fluid dropped by Keselowski. Johnson maintained the lead following this caution. He continued to lead following a cycle of green-flag pit stops. At this point, the lead lap cars did not have enough fuel to make it to the finish except for Bowyer. On lap 371, the fourth and final caution of the race occurred for debris in turn 3. During this caution, the leaders came to pit road, with Johnson winning the battle off pit road by taking two tires ahead of Earnhardt Jr. who took four tires. Johnson maintained the lead after the restart and continued on to win the race. This was Johnson's fifth win in 2013 and eighth career win at Dover, setting the track record for most wins by breaking a tie with Richard Petty and Bobby Allison.

Results

Qualifying

Race results

Standings after the race

Drivers' Championship standings

Manufacturers' Championship standings

Note: Only the first thirteen positions are included for the driver standings.

References

AAA 400
AAA 400
AAA 400
NASCAR races at Dover Motor Speedway